Thaung Htike Min (also spelt Thoung Htike Min) is a Burmese businessman. He is currently managing director of JL Family Group, the parent company of Flying Tiger Engineering, and chairman of Thukha Yadana Company.

References

Burmese businesspeople
Living people
Year of birth missing (living people)